The following is a list of awards and nominations received by Austrian-German actor Christoph Waltz.

Major associations

Academy Awards

British Academy Film Awards

Primetime Emmy Awards

Golden Globe Awards

Screen Actors Guild Awards

Miscellaneous awards

Adolf Grimme Award

Cannes Film Festival

Critics' Choice Association Awards

Empire Awards

MTV Movie & TV Awards

Satellite Awards

Saturn Awards

Decorations and other recognitions
In addition to the awards mentioned above:
 1982: O.E. Hasse Prize from the Berlin Academy of Arts
 2010: Romy: Favorite Actor
 2010: Santa Barbara International Film Festival: Cinema Vanguard Award
 2012: Austrian Cross of Honour for Science and Art
 2014: Hollywood Walk of Fame

References

External links

Waltz, Christopher